Antoine "Scoop" Jordan (born March 10, 1983) is an American professional basketball player. Antoine attended Siena College and played as their point guard from 2002 to 2005. He has played overseas in Italy, the Netherlands, Israel, Lithuania and Germany. In 2010 Antoine signed with BG Goettingen. He has a wife and two kids that reside in Maryland.

FINLAND
Antoine "Scoop" Jordan has currently taken his talents to Kouvola Finland. The American arrived in Finland at the end of September... we got a new promising and motivated player added to our roster. He fits our team well, and with his age and structure, he has the opportunity to play for a breakthrough season at the level of men's MAIN SERIES. Antoine is a versatile player, and a good shooter and Screen user, he fits our team . Jordan is an experienced player, which I look forward to come to terms quickly with the team. According to our preliminary data, he has a great personality and a good role model for our young team, head coach jyri Lehtonen explained. His wife Shawn and children has accompanied him in his journey..Looks like Jordan may consider making this a second home. stay tune.

References

External links
Siena Saints Profile

1983 births
Living people
African-American basketball players
Albany Patroons players
American expatriate basketball people in Colombia
American expatriate basketball people in Finland
American expatriate basketball people in Germany
American expatriate basketball people in Italy
American expatriate basketball people in Lithuania
American expatriate basketball people in the Netherlands
American men's basketball players
Basketball players from Maryland
BG Göttingen players
Fort Worth Flyers players
Kouvot players
Matrixx Magixx players
People from Randallstown, Maryland
Point guards
Shooting guards
Siena Saints men's basketball players
Sportspeople from Baltimore County, Maryland
Tulsa 66ers players
21st-century African-American sportspeople
20th-century African-American people